Interstate 840 (I-840) is a  auxiliary Interstate Highway and state highway in the U.S. state of North Carolina. It is the northern half of the Greensboro Urban Loop beltway around the city of Greensboro. It connects I-40, I-73, and US 421 in the west with I-40, I-85, and I-785 in the east. It was completed on January 23, 2023.

I-840 runs concurrently with I-73 from its western terminus to its interchange with Bryan Boulevard in the northwest and I-785 from its interchange with US 29 (North O'Henry Boulevard) in the northeast to its eastern terminus. The route provides a continuous freeway bypass around Greensboro's west, north, and east sides.

Route description
I-840 begins as a divided six-lane urban freeway at an interchange with I-40, I-73, and US 421.

History

I-840 first appeared in the early 2000s as a proposed routing for the northern half of the Greensboro Urban Loop. In 2002, the first segment opened between US 70 (Burlington Road) and I-40/I-85; however, it was unsigned and designated as SR 3269; by 2006, Future I-840 signage was added at the US 70 interchange. In December 2007, a second segment opened along its routing between I-40/US 421 and Bryan Boulevard and was signed as Future I-73/I-840. In 2010, the North Carolina Department of Transportation (NCDOT) submitted its official request, to both the American Association of State Highway and Transportation Officials (AASHTO) and the Federal Highway Administration (FHWA), to designate the two existing segments of the northern half of the Greensboro Urban Loop as I-840 and the  unbuilt portion as Future I-840. AASHTO approved the request on October 29, 2010, followed by FHWA on August 2, 2011. On September 2, 2011, NCDOT certified the route change establishing I-840.

Construction on the northern half of the Greensboro Urban Loop resumed in 2013 with the six-lane  segment between Bryan Boulevard and Battleground Avenue (US 220), which will be signed as I-840. At a cost of $123 million (equivalent to $ in ), it was expected to be completed in early 2018. This section opened on April 19, 2018, four days ahead of schedule. In late 2014, a  segment, between US 29 and US 70, also began construction; however, it was signed as I-785 with I-840 as a hidden designation until the completion of the Loop. This section opened in December 2017. The next section to open was between US 220 and Lawndale Drive, which began construction in October 2016 and opened to traffic on December 30, 2019.

The final section of I-840 to be constructed was the  segment between Lawndale Drive and US 29, featuring interchanges with North Elm Street and Yanceyville Street. Construction began in May 2018. On December 23, 2020, part of the section, from Lawndale Drive to North Elm Street, was opened to traffic. In October 2022, AASHTO approved the designation of I-840 for the remaining section, from North Elm Street to North O'Henry Boulevard (US 29). This final section opened to traffic on January 23, 2023, completing the Greensboro Urban Loop.

Future
Long-term plans call for an additional interchange along I-840 at an extension of East Cone Boulevard (SR 2565). Plans for the interchange have existed since 2004; however, because it is to be constructed after I-840's completion, there is no current timetable or funding for the project.

Exit list

See also

References

External links

 Greensboro Urban Loop | AARoads Interstate Guide
 N.C. Roads.com: I-840
 NCDOT: Greensboro Urban Loop

40-8 North Carolina
40-8
840 North Carolina
Transportation in Greensboro, North Carolina
Transportation in Guilford County, North Carolina